Makole is an administrative ward in the Dodoma Urban district of the Dodoma Region of Tanzania. In 2016 the Tanzania National Bureau of Statistics report there were 11,416 people in the ward, from 10,504 in 2012.

References

Dodoma
Wards of Dodoma Region